Broad Green is a ward in the London Borough of Croydon, London in the United Kingdom, covering the West Croydon area. Broad Green locality is divided between this ward and Selhurst ward.

The ward extends from central Croydon to the south to the boundary with the London Boroughs of Sutton and Merton by Mitcham Common. It includes part of the retail core of Croydon and the northern part of the Purley Way retail area.

The ward returns three councillors every four years. At the 2006 election, Stuart Collins, Mike Selva, and Manju Shahul-Hameed were elected, as Labour Party candidates. The population of the Ward at the 2011 Census was 18,652.

The ward is in Croydon North constituency, with Steve Reed as Member of Parliament.

The ward became smaller in 2018, following boundary changes in Croydon.

List of Councillors

Mayoral election results 
Below are the results for the candidate which received the highest share of the popular vote in the ward at each mayoral election.

Ward results

2018 to present

2002 to 2014

1978 to 1998

The by-election was called following the resignation of Cllr. Anthony J. Slatcher.

1964 to 1974

References

External links
Council Elections 2006 results - Broad Green
 London Borough of Croydon map of wards.
Labour Councillors in Croydon.
Broad Green Conservatives.

Wards of the London Borough of Croydon